Abu al-Abbas Ahmad ibn Ja'far al-Khazraji al-Sabti (Sabta 1129 - Marrakesh 1204), better known as Sidi Bel Abbas, was a Moroccan Muslim saint. He is the patron saint of Marrakesh in the Islamic tradition and also one of the "Seven Saints" (Sabʿatou Rijal) of the city. His festival was founded by al-Hasan al-Yusi at the instigation of Moulay Ismael.

Abu Al-Abbas was born in Sabta (Ceuta). He studied under Abu Abd Allah al-Fakhkhar, himself a student of Qadi Ayyad. In 1145-6, he moved to Marrakesh, during the final weeks of the Almohad siege of the city. For a number of years he lived in a cave on the hill of Igilliz outside Marrakesh, only coming into town on Fridays for the communal prayer.

The Almohad sultan Yaqub al-Mansur was a disciple of Abu al-Abbas. He asked him to come and live in the city and provided him a house, a hostel for his disciples as well as a madrasa for study. Teaching was maintained by the sultan's own funds. Whenever Yaqub al-Mansur visited Abu al-Abbas he made a point of behaving in a humble manner and acting "as a servant".

To Abu al-Abbas, every act of human mercy (rahma) evoked a merciful response from the all-merciful God (ar-Rahim). Abu al-Abbas summed up his theory of reciprocity with the maxim: "[Divine] Being is actualised by generosity" (al-wujud yanfa ilu bi'l-jud). The Andalusian philosopher Ibn Rushd visited Abu al-Abbas several times in Marrakesh.

When Abu al-Abbas died in 1204, he was buried at the graveyard of Sidi Marouk, near Bab Taghzout. In 1605, the Saadian sultan Abu Faris erected a mausoleum for Abu al-Abbas, hoping that the saint's power would help him recover from his epilepsy. In 1988, sultan Hassan II improved the sanctuary. It is also the place of his zawiya.

Abu al-Abbas's hagiography, Akhbar Abi'l-Abbas as-Sabti, written by Abu Ya’qub Yusuf ibn Yahya at-Tadili, was in part composed by Abu al-Abbas himself and contains many autobiographical passages.

See also
 Sidi Bel Abbas sanctuary, a Muslim holy place located in the Spanish enclave of Ceuta
Zawiya of Sidi Bel Abbes in Marrakesh, containing his mausoleum

References

1129 births
1204 deaths
12th-century Moroccan people
13th-century Moroccan people
Moroccan Sufi writers
People from Ceuta
Moroccan philosophers